Lost artworks are original pieces of art that credible sources indicate once existed but that cannot be accounted for in museums or private collections or are known to have been destroyed deliberately or accidentally, or neglected through ignorance and lack of connoisseurship.

The US FBI maintains a list of "Top Ten Art Crimes"; a 2006 book by Simon Houpt and a 2018 book by Noah Charney and several other media outlets have profiled the most significant outstanding losses.

Chronology of notable loss events

Rhodes earthquake, 226 BCE
First Mithridatic War
Sack of Athens, 1 March 86 BCE
Antikythera shipwreck, 86-50 BCE
Lauseion fire, 475
Nika riots, 13 January 532-
Byzantine Iconoclasm
Iconoclasm of Leo III, 726-741
Second Byzantine Iconoclasm, 814-842
Jin–Song Wars, 1125–1234
Jingkang Incident (Sack of Kaifeng), 10 January 1126-
Fourth Crusade, 1202–1204
Sack of Constantinople, 12–15 April 1204
Bonfires of the vanities, 1492–1497
Bonfire of the vanities, Florence, 1492
Bonfire of the vanities, Florence, 7 February 1497
Palazzo Bentivoglio destruction, 1507
Iconoclastic Fury, 1522–1599
Beeldenstorm, 1566
"Stille beeldenstorm" of Antwerp, 1581
Doge's Palace fire, 1576
 Russo-Swedish Deluge 1648-1667
Destruction of the Commonwealth
Bombardment of Brussels, 13–15 August 1695
Brussels Town Hall fire, 13–15 August 1695
Palace of Whitehall fire, 4 January 1698
André-Charles Boulle workshop fire, 30 August 1720
Coudenberg Palace fire, 3 February 1731
Royal Alcázar of Madrid fire, 24 December 1734
Kroměříž Palace fire, March 1752
Lisbon earthquake and tsunami, 1 November 1755
Ribeira Palace destruction
Vrouw Maria sinking, 9 October 1771
French Revolution, 1789–1799
Elgin Marbles removal, 1801–1805
Exton Old Park fire, 1810
Belvoir Castle fire, 1816
Basilica of San Paolo fuori le Mura fire, 1823
Burning of Parliament, 16 October 1834
Palais-Royal looting, 21–22 February 1848
Old Summer Palace destruction, 18–21 October 1861
Museum Boymans fire, 1864
Paris Commune, 18 March-28 May 1871
Hôtel de Ville fire, May 1871
Tuileries Palace fire, 23 May 1871
Holker Hall fire, 1871
Great Boston Fire of 1872
Bath House fire, 31 January 1873
Pantechnicon warehouse fire, London, 13–14 February 1874
Benin City sacking, 9 February 1897-
San Francisco Earthquake, April 18, 1906
Messina earthquake, 28 December 1908
Mona Lisa theft and vandalism, 21 August 1911
World War I, 28 July 1914 – 11 November 1918
Russian Revolution and post-revolution losses, 1917-1920s
Treasures for Tractors, 1920s
Thames flood (Tate Gallery flood), 7 January 1928
Glaspalast fire, 6 June 1931
Nazi plunder, 1933–1945
Berlin Fire Department art burning, 20 March 1939
Frey seizures (1939-1942)
Reichsleiter Rosenberg Taskforce seizures, 1940–1945
Mühlmann Agency seizures, 1939–1945
Einsatzgruppen unit seizures, 1939–1945
SS-Ahnenerbe unit seizures, 1939–1945
Panels from the Ghent Altarpiece theft, 10 April 1934
Spanish Civil War, 1936–1939
 World War II, 1 September 1939 – 2 September 1945
Gosford House fire, 1940
Castle Howard fire, 9 November 1940
The Blitz, 7 September 1940 – 21 May 1941
Bridgewater House bombing, 11 May 1941
Bombardment of Manila, December 1941
Bombing of Bremen, 1942
Palazzo Archinto (Milan) bombing, 1943
Battle of Monte Cassino, 17 January – 18 May 1944
Ovetari Chapel bombing, 11 March 1944
Destruction of Warsaw, 1944–45
Royal Castle, Warsaw explosion
Bombing of Dresden, February 1945
Battle of Manila, 3 February – 3 March 1945
Schloss Immendorf fire, May 1945
Friedrichshain flak tower fire, May 1945
Ashiya District air raids, 5–6 August 1945
Quedlinburg medieval art theft, 19 April – June 1945
Soviet looting, 1939–1945
Kronberg Castle looting, 5 November 1945
Arno Breker Sculpture Destruction, 1945-
Arshile Gorky studio fire, 1946
Alfred Stieglitz Gallery theft, 1946
Musée de Beaux Arts de Strasbourg fire, 13 August 1947
Coleshill House fire, 1952
Museum of Modern Art (MoMA) fire, 15 August 1958
American Airlines Flight 1 plane crash, 1962
Dulwich College Picture Gallery theft, 30 December 1966
Izmir Archaeology Museum theft, 24 July 1969
Oratory of San Lorenzo theft, October 1969
Stephen Hahn Gallery theft, 17 November 1969
Montreal Museum of Fine Arts theft, 4 September 1972
Musée Albert-André, Bagnols-sur-Cèze, theft, 12 November 1972
Invasion of Cyprus church thefts, 1974
Russborough House art theft #1, 1974
Palais des Papes Picasso theft, 31 January 1976
Corridart installation destruction, Montreal, 1976
Museum of Modern Art, Rio de Janeiro fire, 8 July 1978
Varig plane disappearance, 30 January 1979
L.A. Mayer Institute for Islamic Art theft, 15 April 1983
Kunsthaus Zürich incendiary attack, 1985
Musée Marmottan Monet theft, 28 October 1985
Russborough House art theft #2, 1986
Neue Nationalgalerie theft, 27 May 1988
Isabella Stewart Gardner Museum theft, 18 March 1990
Lincoln's Inn theft, 16 September 1990
Houghton Hall theft, 30 September 1992
Windsor Castle fire, 20 November 1992
Uffizi car bombing, 1993
Moderna Museet theft, 8 November 1993
The Scream theft, 12 February 1994
Kunsthalle Schirn theft (Frankfurt art theft), 28 July 1994
Stéphane Breitwieser: 172 museum thefts, 1995–2001
Oklahoma City bombing (Murrah Building collapse), 19 April 1995
Galleria Ricci Oddi theft, 18 February 1997
Louvre theft, 3 May 1998
Swissair Flight 111 plane crash, 2 September 1998
Ashmolean Museum theft, 31 December 1999
Nationalmuseum theft, 22 Dec 2000
Russborough House art theft #3, 2001
National Museum, Poznań theft, September 2000
Sofia Imber Contemporary Art Museum theft, 2000–2002
Taliban iconoclasm, March 2001
Hermitage Museum theft, 22 March 2001
 September 11 attacks, 2001
World Trade Center Collapse, 11 September 2001
Marielle Schwengel's destruction of stolen art, November 2001
Frans Hals Museum theft, 25 March 2002
Edenhurst Gallery theft, 28 July 2002
Russborough House art theft #4, September 2002
Van Gogh Museum theft, 8 December 2002
2003 Iraq War
National Museum of Iraq thefts, 8–12 April 2003
Kunsthistorisches Museum theft, 11 May 2003
Drumlanrig Castle theft, 27 August 2003
Momart fire, 24 May 2004
Santo Spirito in Sassia Hospital theft, 31 July 2004
Munch Museum theft, 22 August 2004
Neumann Foundation theft, 27 October 2004
Victoria and Albert Museum theft, 29 December 2004
Westfries Museum theft, 9 January 2005
Henry Moore Foundation theft, 15 December 2005
Strindberg Museum theft, 15 February 2006
Museu da Chácara do Céu, Rio de Janeiro theft, 24 February 2006
São Paulo Museum of Art theft, 20 December 2007
Foundation E.G. Bührle theft, 10 February 2008
Pinacoteca do Estado de São Paulo theft, 12 June 2008
Hélio Oiticica fire, 16 October 2009
Musée d'Art Moderne de la Ville de Paris theft, 10 May 2010
Dulwich Park theft, 20 December 2011
Kunsthal Art theft, 16 October 2012
Clandon House fire, 29 April 2015
National Museum of Brazil fire, 2 September 2018
Dresden Green Vault burglary 2019
2022 Russian invasion of Ukraine
Burning of the Museum of Local History in the town of Ivankiv, Kyiv region, February 2022
Destruction of

Research and recovery efforts 

The Art Loss Register is a commercial computerized international database which captures information about lost and stolen art, antiques and collectables. It is operated by a commercial company based in London.

In the U.S., the FBI maintains the Stolen Art File, "a database of stolen art and cultural property. Stolen objects are submitted for entry to the NSAF by law enforcement agencies in the U.S. and abroad."

A number of search and recovery efforts were created in response to major loss events, notably:
Monuments, Fine Arts, and Archives program ("Monuments Men"), 1943–1946
Bureau of Revindication and Damages (Poland), operated from 1945 to 1951
Bureau of the Government Representative for Polish Cultural Heritage Abroad, 1991-

List of notable lost artworks

Pre-16th century

16th century

17th century

18th century

19th century

20th century

21st century

List of notable finds

List of notable disputed finds

See also 
List of missing treasures
Lost film
Lost work
List of destroyed heritage
List of destroyed libraries
List of monuments and memorials removed during the George Floyd protests

References

Notes

Bibliography

Books

Journals

News

External links 

The Story of Leonardo da Vinci's Horse
9/11 Attacks Destroy Cultural and Historical Artifacts
The Britart fire
Lost Art. Sterling and Francine Clark Art Institute. Library Collections. In the Library's Photographs and Clippings Files.
Lost Art — Masterpieces Destroyed in War in Flickr
Destroyed Works of Art and Architecture Group in Flickr